Five Corners is an unincorporated community in Lake County in the U.S. state of Oregon.

References

Unincorporated communities in Lake County, Oregon
Unincorporated communities in Oregon